Millsite State Park is a state park on the south end of Millsite Reservoir at the mouth of Ferron Canyon in western Emery County, Utah, United States, just west of the town of Ferron.

Description
Millsite State Park offers access to off highway vehicle and mountain bike riding areas. The reservoir is open to swimming, boating, waterskiing, and fishing. Adjacent to the park is a public 18-hole golf course.

Millsite Reservoir is part of the Ferron Watershed Project, a multipurpose water containment completed in 1970 with the combined efforts of several agencies. Before the dam was built, there was an old dam at the site to service a flourmill, hence the reservoir name.

See also

 List of Utah State Parks

References

External links

 Millsite State Park

Protected areas of Emery County, Utah
State parks of Utah